Landonia latidens is a species of characin endemic to Ecuador, where it occurs in the Vinces River. This species is the only species in its genus.

References

Characidae
Monotypic fish genera
Fish of South America
Fish of Ecuador
Fish described in 1914